This is a list of German television related events from 2006.

Events
26 February - Michael Knopf wins the sixth season of Big Brother Germany.
9 March - Texas Lightning are selected to represent Germany at the 2006 Eurovision Song Contest with their song "No No Never". They are selected to be the fifty-first German Eurovision entry during Der deutsche Vorentscheid 2006 – 50 Jahre Grand Prix held at the Deutsches Schauspielhaus in Hamburg.
18 March - Tobias Regner wins the third season of Deutschland sucht den Superstar.
21 May - Unser Charly actor Wayne Carpendale and his partner Isabel Edvardsson win the first season of Let's Dance.

Debuts

Domestic
3 April - Let's Dance (2006–present) (RTL)
29 October -  (2006) (Sat.1)

International
10 February -  Pet Alien (2005) (KiKA)
3 May -  American Dad! (2005–present) (MTV)
8 May -  Postman Pat (1981, 1991, 1994, 1996, 2004–2008) (ORF 1)
19 October -  Bones (2005–2017) (RTL)

Military Television

Military Television Debuts

BFBS
 Muffin the Mule (2005)

Television shows

1950s
Tagesschau (1952–present)

1960s
 heute (1963–present)

1970s
 heute-journal (1978–present)
 Tagesthemen (1978–present)

1980s
Wetten, dass..? (1981-2014)
Lindenstraße (1985–present)

1990s
Gute Zeiten, schlechte Zeiten (1992–present)
Marienhof (1992–2011)
Unter uns (1994–present)
Verbotene Liebe (1995-2015)
Schloss Einstein (1998–present)
In aller Freundschaft (1998–present)
Wer wird Millionär? (1999–present)

2000s
Big Brother Germany (2000-2011, 2015–present)
Deutschland sucht den Superstar (2002–present)

Ending this year

Births

Deaths

See also
2006 in Germany